The Late Shift or Late Shift may refer to:

The Late Shift (book), a 1994 book about 1990s conflict regarding The Tonight Show
The Late Shift (film), a 1996 HBO film based on the book
Comedy Inc: The Late Shift, a 2005–2007 series of Australian sketch show Comedy Inc.
 Late Shift, a full-motion video game released in 2017